The 2006 European Judo Open Championships were the 3rd edition of the European Judo Open Championships, and were held in Novi Sad, Serbia on 9 December 2006.

The European Judo Open Championships was staged because the open class event had been dropped from the European Judo Championships program from 2004. Unlike the regular European Judo Championships, several competitors from each country are allowed to enter.

Results

References

External links
 

European Championships, Open
Judo Championships
European Judo Open Championships
International sports competitions hosted by Serbia
Sports competitions in Novi Sad
Judo competitions in Serbia
December 2006 sports events in Europe
21st century in Novi Sad